Cora davidia is a species of basidiolichen in the family Hygrophoraceae. It was formally described as a new species in 2016 by Bibiana Moncada, Leidy Vargas-Mendoza, and Robert Lücking. The specific epithet davidia honours mycologist David Leslie Hawksworth, "in recognition of his nomenclatural work on Dictyonema."

References

davidia
Lichen species
Lichens described in 2016
Lichens of Colombia
Lichens of Ecuador
Taxa named by Robert Lücking
Basidiolichens